Camilo Nicanor Carrillo Martínez (27 March 1844  – 19 March 1898) was a captain of the Peruvian Navy who participated in the War of the Pacific. 

Specialized in Mathematical Sciences, he was a professor at the Universidad Nacional Mayor de San Marcos. He was also Minister of Finance and Commerce (1871 and 1873-1874), national deputy and president of the chamber (1878-1879), as well as Minister of War and Navy (3/12–7/18/1881 and 1899) and President of the Council of Ministers (1881 and 1882 -1883).

Sources

1830 births
1901 deaths
 Peruvian Navy personnel of the War of the Pacific